Ghost Talker's Daydream, known in Japan as , is a shōnen manga written by Saki Okuse and illustrated by Sankichi Meguro, set in modern Japan. There are 10 volumes in total, and the series was also adapted as a four episode OVA. The English version released by Geneon changed the title to Ghost Talker's Daydream, which is not a direct translation of the formal manga title.

The protagonist is the virgin albino woman Saiki Misaki holding down three jobs, none of which she finds herself particularly happy with; as a dominatrix in a BDSM club, as a writer of a column for a porno magazine, and as a civil servant in the employ of The Livelihood Preservation Group as a necromancer able to perceive and to communicate with ghosts, sometimes allowing them to speak through her with the living. Her government job usually entails exorcism. Misaki considers her shamanic civil service position even more tawdry and less respectable than her sex work.

Subplots, often of one or two chapters in length, include such as introduce important characters, and others to help develop motivations of leading characters.

There are three major characters, at least one of whom appears in every chapter with the exception of chapter 16 "Dead Man's Hand." In order of introduction they are: Saiki Misaki, Mitsuru and Souichirou. Various recurring and often important characters also populate the series.

Fan service, nudity and sexual themes are all integral to motivation and backstory, along with insight into Japanese suicide culture and sexual dysfunction with sexual and physical abuse, such carnal troubles of the soul from which even death may guarantee no release.

The Japanese title translates as teizoku = vulgar + rei = ghost. However, there is a pun on the word rei, which can also refer to a companion. In other words, it can be said either Vulgar Ghost or Vulgar Companion, for Misaki Saiki is indeed a vulgar companion in contending with vulgar apparitions.

Characters
 Saiki Misaki:  Misaki is an albino woman with the distinctive lack of pigmentation that accompanies that condition. Her pink eyes and white hair are also accompanied by a complete lack of pubic hair which causes her some embarrassment. These attributes together put her in high demand for her line of work as a professional Dominatrix for the Roppongi Myure Mule S&M club and contributor to the porno magazine Honey Chop. Misaki is also a necromancer able to see, hear, and speak to ghosts, a talent of which she is most self-deprecating, despite extreme proficiency in both vocations. And Misaki's background and character is even further complicated by her somewhat incongruous virginity.
 Kadotake Souichirou:  Misaki's partner within and regular liaison to the Livelihood Preservation Group. He is excitable and fascinated by Misaki's erotic vocation. Little does he know, he yearns to be dominated. A proficient martial artist mostly in Judo, Souichirou is still not a master. He has many contacts and proficient at compiling information, but deathly afraid of ghosts which makes him an odd partner for a necromancer.
 Fujiwara Mitsuru:  A high school student still drawn to but wary of domination because of a past relationship with a much older woman, and infatuated with Misaki who rebuffs him as a pest and a stalker. All in all, nevertheless, seemingly a good person, Mitsuru is the son of a Shinto priest to whom he has become somewhat estranged.
 Kunugi Ai:  A quiet middle school girl whose sister committed suicide, which Misaki helped her investigate and understand, along with the unintentional death of her niece. Ai is a novice necromancer who looks up to Misaki as her mentor (senpai). Friendly and remarkably brave.
 Kinue: Misaki's mysterious demonic familiar and guardian, taking the form of a rope or cord twisted out from a braid of hair. Misaki often wears him as a garment, and he must occasionally feed off of humans in some unexplained manner.
 Shizue Mikuriya:  An editor and model at the porno magazine Honey Chop. Openly lesbian and friend to Misaki.
 Saiki Shigeyuki: Misaki's father and the chief administrator of the Livelihood Preservation Group. Divorced from Misaki's mother whose whereabouts are unknown. Somewhat estranged from his daughter.
 Detective Gada: A police detective with unexplained issues relating to necromancy. Has a relationship with the necromancer Isa Haru. Is prone to use somewhat unethical means to achieve his goals.
 Isa Haru: Detective Gada's domestic partner and also a necromancer. Known to be a true hermaphrodite though living as a woman. Seemingly maladjusted and in poor physical health.
 Yujima Hijiri: Mitsuru's middle-aged lover who killed herself who continues to haunt him as a ghost.
 Detective Yamazaki: 
 Detective Anzai: 
 Ichinose: 
 Lisa: A very good mahjong player and possible necromancer.
 Funakoshi: Another necromancer employed by the Livelihood Preservation Group.

Manga

Anime
Vulgar Ghost Daydream has also been produced as a short run OVA anime of four episodes in 2004. In Japanese, the title is still Teizokurei Daydream, but United States distributor Geneon Animation has re-titled the release Ghost Talker's Daydream. Of the four episodes, two follow the chapters from the manga decently, but the other two have very little relationship to the manga.

Episode list

References

External links
 
 

2000 manga
2004 anime OVAs
Dark Horse Comics titles
Discotek Media
Geneon USA
Hal Film Maker
Horror anime and manga
Kadokawa Shoten manga
Kadokawa Dwango franchises
Shōnen manga
BDSM literature